Madia is a genus of herbs. Madia may also refer to
Madia (surname)
Madia (furniture) that was used in the 16 century
Madia, a subgroup of Burarra people in Australia
Madia Gond, a tribe in Maharashtra State, India